Ara Bedrossian (born 2 June 1967) is a Cypriot former professional footballer who played as a midfielder.

Early and personal life
He is of Armenian descent. His father was a Cypriot tennis champion. He moved to England in 1974 following the Turkish invasion of Cyprus.

Career

Early career
In England, Bedrossian played youth football with AYA before playing semi-professionally with Kingstonian. He spent his early career in Cyprus with APOEL, playing for them for 8 years.

Playing in England
He moved from Queens Park Rangers to Fulham at the end of the 1992–93 season. While playing with Fulham he has trials at Birmingham City and Middlesbrough. Bedrossian made a total of 42 league appearances for Fulham, scoring 1 goal. He also played for Stevenage Borough.

Later career
Bedrossian later played in Sweden before returning to Cyprus, playing for APOEL and Olympiakos Nicosia, where he retired from playing at the age of 35.

He later ran the Arsenal Soccer School in Cyprus as well as being Arsenal's scout for Eastern Europe. He also managed AGBU Ararat, a futsal team.

References

1967 births
Living people
Cypriot people of Armenian descent
Cypriot footballers
Kingstonian F.C. players
APOEL FC players
Queens Park Rangers F.C. players
Fulham F.C. players
Stevenage F.C. players
Olympiakos Nicosia players
English Football League players
Association football midfielders
Cypriot expatriate footballers
Cypriot expatriate sportspeople in England
Expatriate footballers in England
Cypriot expatriate sportspeople in Sweden
Expatriate footballers in Sweden